Åke and His World is a 1984 Swedish drama film directed by Allan Edwall. It was entered into the 14th Moscow International Film Festival. The film was also selected as the Swedish entry for the Best Foreign Language Film at the 57th Academy Awards, but was not accepted as a nominee.

Cast
 Martin Lindström as Åke
 Loa Falkman as Åke's father
 Gunnel Fred as Åke's mother
 Katja Blomquist as Åke's sister Aja
 Ulla Sjöblom as Åke's grandmother
 Suzanne Ernrup as Anne-Marie
 Björn Gustafson as Bergström
 Alexander Skarsgård as Kalle Nubb
 Stellan Skarsgård as Ebenholtz
 Allan Edwall as Principal Godeman

See also
 List of submissions to the 57th Academy Awards for Best Foreign Language Film
 List of Swedish submissions for the Academy Award for Best Foreign Language Film

References

External links
 
 

1984 films
1984 drama films
Swedish drama films
1980s Swedish-language films
1980s Swedish films